Cymbonotus preissianus, commonly known as Austral bears ear, is an Australian species of small shrub in the daisy family. A perennial herbaceous plant without stems, to 30 cm in diameter. Yellow flowers form from August to March. The habitat is woodland and sclerophyll forest, usually associated with disturbed areas, leaf litter and drainage lines. The type specimen was collected by Ludwig Preiss and the plant was described in 1845 by the German botanist Joachim Steetz.

References

Astereae
Plants described in 1845
Flora of New South Wales
Flora of Victoria (Australia)
Flora of Queensland
Flora of Tasmania
Flora of South Australia
Flora of Western Australia